Ismaily Gonçalves dos Santos (born 11 January 1990), known simply as Ismaily, is a Brazilian professional footballer who plays as a left-back for Ligue 1 club Lille.

After starting out at Ivinhema, and three and a half seasons in Portugal with three clubs, he went on to spend most of his career with Shakhtar Donetsk in the Ukrainian Premier League, winning several titles.

Club career

Brazil
Born in Angélica, Mato Grosso do Sul, Ismaily started his career with Ivinhema Futebol Clube in 2007. A forward, he scored 11 goals to be his team's top scorer in the 2008 Campeonato Sul-Mato-Grossense.

Ismaily subsequently moved to Desportivo Brasil, being immediately loaned to Esporte Clube São Bento until the end of the Copa Paulista. However, he failed to make an appearance for the club.

Back at Desportivo Brasil, Ismaily played for the under-20s in the 2009 Copa São Paulo de Futebol Júnior and was converted to a left back, before being promoted to the first team. He made his competitive debut on 10 May of that year, coming on as a first-half substitute in a 1–2 Campeonato Paulista Segunda Divisão home loss against Red Bull Brasil, and appeared in only eight first-team matches before departing.

Portugal
In the 2009–10 season, 19-year-old Ismaily moved to Portugal, signing for G.D. Estoril-Praia in the Segunda Liga and playing all the games but one (always as a starter) to help to an 11th-place finish. His first goal for his new club occurred on 8 November 2009, in a 2–0 home win over Gil Vicente FC.

Ismaily stayed in the country in summer 2010, joining Primeira Liga side S.C. Olhanense. He appeared in 25 matches in his second year, scoring in a 3–2 away defeat of Vitória F.C. to help complete a comeback from 0–2.

On 16 June 2012, after an aborted transfer to C.D. Nacional, Ismaily agreed to a four-year contract with S.C. Braga. He made his competitive debut at S.L. Benfica in the league opener, providing two assists in an eventual 2–2 draw.

On 22 August 2012, in the first leg of the last qualifying round of the UEFA Champions League, Ismaily equalised for Braga with a 30-meter effort for the final 1–1 home draw against Udinese Calcio.

Shakhtar Donetsk
In February 2013, Ismaily signed a five-year deal with FC Shakhtar Donetsk, joining a host of compatriots at the Ukrainian Premier League side. In October 2018 he was voted the competition's Player of the Month, becoming the second Brazilian player to receive that award.

Lille
On 5 August 2022, Ismaily joined Lille OSC on a free transfer, on a one-year contract with an optional year. He made his Ligue 1 debut one week later, closing the 1–1 draw at FC Nantes after an assist from Jonathan David and scoring the club's 5,000th goal in all competitions in the process.

International career
In May 2017, Ismaily expressed interest in playing for the Ukraine national team. On 20 March 2018, however, after the injuries of Filipe Luís and Alex Sandro, he was called by Brazil coach Tite for friendlies against Russia and Germany.

Personal life
Ismaily was named after the motion picture Smiley, from 1956.

Career statistics

Club

Honours
Ivinhema
Campeonato Sul-Matogrossense: 2008

Braga
Taça da Liga: 2012–13

Shakhtar Donetsk
Ukrainian Premier League: 2012–13, 2013–14, 2016–17, 2017–18, 2018–19, 2019–20
Ukrainian Cup: 2012–13, 2015–16, 2016–17, 2017–18, 2018–19
Ukrainian Super Cup: 2013, 2014, 2015, 2017, 2021

References

External links

1990 births
Living people
Sportspeople from Mato Grosso do Sul
Brazilian footballers
Association football defenders
Desportivo Brasil players
Esporte Clube São Bento players
Primeira Liga players
Liga Portugal 2 players
G.D. Estoril Praia players
S.C. Olhanense players
S.C. Braga players
Ukrainian Premier League players
FC Shakhtar Donetsk players
Ligue 1 players
Lille OSC players
Brazilian expatriate footballers
Expatriate footballers in Portugal
Expatriate footballers in Ukraine
Expatriate footballers in France
Brazilian expatriate sportspeople in Portugal
Brazilian expatriate sportspeople in Ukraine
Brazilian expatriate sportspeople in France